"East Easy Rider" is a song by the English singer-songwriter Julian Cope. It is the second single released in support of his album Peggy Suicide.

Chart positions

References

1991 singles
Julian Cope songs
1991 songs
Songs written by Julian Cope
Island Records singles